Walkertshofen is a municipality  in the district of Augsburg in Bavaria in Germany.
It is set amongst gentle rolling hills of the farm district of Bavaria that are occasionally covered in snow during the winter months. Its only source of retail is one public hotel for food and refreshments. The majority of the population in the past have been mainly engaged in the workings of the surrounding farms with a small portion working on the building of the autobahns (main highways).

Within the centre of the town is a monument dedicated to those who lived within the town and lost their lives as a result of the European conflicts.

The current population of Walkertshofen is 1,100, who are primarily Roman Catholics.{{cn}date=April 2020}}

References

Augsburg (district)